A Woman Who Knows What She Wants is a 1958 West German musical comedy film directed by Arthur Maria Rabenalt and starring Lilli Palmer, Peter Schütte and Maria Sebaldt. It is based on a 1932 stage musical composed by Oscar Straus, which had previously been made into a 1934 film.

It was shot at the Bavaria Studios in Munich. The film's sets were designed by the art director Walter Haag.

Cast
Lilli Palmer as Julia Klöhn, Lehrerin & Angela Cavallini
Peter Schütte as Viktor Keller
Maria Sebaldt as Emmy
Rudolf Vogel as Herzmansky
Gerd Frickhöffer as Fritz Hollmann
Fritz Eckhardt as Arpad Kelemen
Rudolf Rhomberg as Dr. Kladde
Barbara Gallauner as Sängerin
Karl-Heinz Peters as Würschich
Alfons Teuber as Gerichtsvollzieher
Gusti Kreissl as Frau Krause
Toni Treutler
Ursula Dinkgräfe as Frau Müller

References

External links

1958 musical comedy films
German musical comedy films
West German films
Films directed by Arthur Maria Rabenalt
Films based on works by Louis Verneuil
Films based on operettas
Films based on adaptations
Remakes of German films
Bavaria Film films
Films shot at Bavaria Studios
1950s German-language films
1950s German films